The HK4 is a pocket pistol, first introduced by Heckler & Koch in 1967. Government agencies received 12,000 pistols in the .32 ACP caliber with the designation P11 and were serial numbered 40001 to 52400.

Design
The HK4 is largely a refined Mauser HSc self-loading pistol. Heckler & Koch were familiar with the HSc design as many of the Heckler & Koch company founders were employees of the Mauser-Werke Oberndorf A.G. company pre- and post-WW2.

Similar to the HSc, the HK4 utilizes a straight blowback action, with a double-action trigger and a slide-mounted safety.

Switching between the three different centerfire chamberings (6.35mm Browning aka .25 ACP, 7.65mm Browning aka .32 ACP, 9mm short aka .380 ACP) merely requires swapping the barrel and recoil spring assembly and the magazine.  Switching between the centerfire chamberings and rimfire chambering (.22 LR) also involves a further step of loosening a screw on the breech face and rotating the removable breech face to either the centerfire or rimfire position. 

Occasionally, the grips were made from light metal (duralumin) and stamped steel; these grips can loosen through use and break unexpectedly while shooting.

Reception and legacy
The HK4 is a historical firearm and marks the beginning of pistol production at Heckler & Koch. In its basic structure and the main manufacturing processes, the HK4 laid groundwork for its much more important and successful successor, the H&K P9S.

Due to its high manufacturing quality and easy caliber change, the HK4 was quite successful on the market, though did not offer serious competition to established Walther PP and PPK pistols. HK4's biggest success was the adoption by West German customs as their service weapon.

For the civilian market, 26,550 pieces were produced, with serial numbers from 10001 to 36550  and 12,400 were produced for the West German police force, with numbers from 40001 to 52400.
Another 8,700 pieces were made for the US market, with production numbers from 001 to 8700 and imported by Harrington & Richardson. In 1971, 2,000 commemorative specimens were produced, with the name plates and triggers made of gold.

Users

: Customs, various police forces

References

External links

Modern Firearms
H&K HK4 Annex
HKPro

.22 LR pistols
.25 ACP semi-automatic pistols
.32 ACP semi-automatic pistols
.380 ACP semi-automatic pistols
Heckler & Koch pistols
Simple blowback firearms